We Heart Seattle (WHS), formerly We Heart Downtown Seattle and incorporated as I Heart Downtown Seattle, is a volunteer organization responding to homelessness in Seattle. The group organizes volunteer trash cleanups in public parks in which homeless people have established camps, primarily through a public Facebook group and Facebook events. Their affiliate We Heart Portland started performing similar cleanups in Portland, Oregon in May 2022.

History

We Heart Seattle was incorporated as I Heart Downtown Seattle on October 29, 2020. Andrea Suarez formed the group and organized volunteers to collect trash that had been left in parks. She told The Jason Rantz Show on KTTH in January 2021 that she was motivated to start the organization by seeing volumes of trash and needles in Denny Park. KIRO-TV reported that she quickly attracted hundreds of like-minded people to volunteer. 
 
Jason Rantz, writing nationally for Fox News, praised WHS for doing "more to address the problems at Denny Park than the city has done in years.". A Seattle Times opinion columnist praised citizen-led groups such as We Heart Seattle for taking responsibility and being active in cleaning up the city in ways that local government has not, and reported in August 2021 that the group had collected more than 150,000 pounds of trash and housed dozens of unsheltered people.

In November 2021, Seattle City Council member Dan Strauss and multiple officials from the City of Seattle and homelessness agencies asked We Heart Seattle to stop their activities in parks. On the Dori Monson Show, Suarez defended the group's actions and promised to continue their volunteering, saying that WHS removes garbage from camps with permission, and characterizing WHS's work as "a form of protest for a more beautiful and clean Seattle". She criticized city policies that mandate that organizations store homeless persons' belongings for 90 days before destroying them and suggested that city safety policies and union work rules are preventing any progress in cleaning up city streets. In response to the council instructions to stop work, Doug Dixon, general manager of Pacific Fishermen Shipyard in Ballard, said that most businesses in his neighborhood welcome WHS's cleanup efforts. Defying this request by city leaders to stop holding cleanup events, WHS volunteers collected and disposed of trash near a homeless encampment in Ballard; Suarez reported that they had now collected over 320,000 pounds of trash.

In November 2021, KVI radio host Ari Hoffman praised WHS for its outreach to Charles Woodward, a homeless man in Ballard nicknamed the "Lawnmower Man" for his collection of equipment. KOMO News reported later that month that WHS had helped Woodward, who was at odds with the community for about a year, to leave the neighborhood when the city services were unable to assist. Councilmember Strauss released a statement saying, “I’m glad when volunteers are able to interact positively with unsheltered residents. In February 2022, Woodward was living on another street in the same neighborhood. Of Woodward, Suarez said, "the person who was managing his housing portfolio was fired from the housing project". Suarez said in February 2022 that Woodward is working for We Heart Seattle, driving a truck for the organization and making $22 an hour. , Woodward no longer lives on the street.

In December 2021, Suarez was included in a Seattle Times editorial praising "people who have contributed to making our region a better place in 2021."

Portland

We Heart Portland, WHS's first branch in another major city, launched on May 1, 2022, having received a $10,000 grant from the Pearl District Neighborhood Association. The group organized its first trash cleanup event in the Pearl District on May 22, offering cash and gift cards as incentives for workers. In August 2022, after resolving a conflict with the Oregon Department of Transportation, We Heart Portland and the Pearl District Neighborhood Association made an "informal deal" with the City of Portland to place bark dust, fences, and "Do Not Enter" signs at sites near Interstate 405 that the city had cleared of homeless encampments. As of August 30, 2022, We Heart Portland had helped 150 homeless people find resources and housing.

Services 
In May 2021, the South Seattle Emerald reported that Suarez has personally driven at least one homeless resident from a Seattle park to enter the Bybee Lakes Hope Center, a homeless shelter in Portland, Oregon. The facility’s director at that time, Jeff Woodward, was also a member of We Heart Seattle’s board of directors. As of May 2022, WHS has transported three Seattle residents and 13 Portland residents to Bybee Lakes.

From October 2020 to March 2021 WHS organized trash cleanup events at Denny Park. In March 2021 the city of Seattle subsequently "swept" the park, removing all homeless persons and their belongings from the premises. One former park resident credited WHS with helping her and her partner get into an apartment, find furniture, and look for a job. Other residents reported not getting referrals. Observers criticized WHS for prioritizing trash removal over health services.

In late April 2021, Suarez described WHS's model as "daily intensive outreach" as WHS announced an intention to provide support, services, and housing options to residents of an encampment near Broadview-Thomson K-8 School in Seattle's Bitter Lake neighborhood. Erica C. Barnett reported that Suarez's actions at the encampment included photography and videography of the conditions and offers to take residents to facilities such as Bybee Lakes Real Change interviewed a resident of the camp who described Suarez's typical routine as walking around for roughly 30 minutes, taking photos or videos, offering to pick up trash, and giving interviews to news reporters about the state of encampments.

In October 2022, We Heart Seattle volunteers stopped an attack in a tent near a cleanup site and assisted the victim by driving her to a tiny house village.

Criticism

Mutual aid groups have criticized We Heart Seattle and Suarez for actions that they say are harmful to the homeless communities in parks where We Heart Seattle holds cleanup events. At a cleanup in Seattle's Miller Park in January 2021, a park resident named Sam observed Suarez recommending that people pick up a bag of garbage in exchange for food although the community kitchen cooking at the event had no such requirement. Sam also observed Suarez comparing campers to "rats and dogs." Suarez later acknowledged the negative impact of her statements and apologized for early missteps. Alycia Ramirez, co-founder of mutual aid group Project Solidarity, and Aidan Carroll of the Cooperative Assembly of Cascadia have criticized We Heart Seattle's actions, voicing concerns to Suarez; both described her as non-receptive.

Some activists opposed to WHS have yelled at WHS volunteers during park cleanups. Others have placed "not wanted" posters bearing Suarez's name and face on utility poles near parks, an act Suarez likened to "school yard bullying".

Observers have alleged that volunteers for WHS and its Portland affiliate have disrespected homeless persons’ privacy. At a Seattle cleanup event, people observed a WHS volunteer entering a tent that had belonged to a homeless person. Suarez disavowed the actions of the volunteer, who apologized on social media. During We Heart Portland's first cleanup event, a homeless man objected when a volunteer looked into his friend's tent. Suarez told Willamette Week, “I don’t see why he’s triggered, but that’s OK, we’re just doing our thing.” Seattle City Council members Tammy Morales and Andrew Lewis have publicly distanced themselves from WHS. After the tent intrusion in her district, Morales posted on social media, “If this happened to a housed person, this would be considered burglary.” Morales additionally criticized the "tough love" approach taken in response to homelessness. Lewis, who had previously met with WHS, told KOMO News that he does not condone private groups conducting trash cleanups.

Erica Barnett reported that Suarez had misrepresented a medical incident as a drug overdose when others present said it was a seizure.

On a conference call with City Councilmember Dan Strauss and "at least 10 other city leaders", WHS was told that its efforts were "disruptive and confusing" to homeless outreach efforts by the city and by Evergreen Treatment Services' REACH program.

In November 2021, We Heart Seattle told a KOMO News reporter that Charles Woodward, who had been living in his vehicle on a street in Ballard, had moved to a different location and that volunteers were trying to help him find housing. In February 2022, the same reporter found Woodward camping in a different part of Ballard, frustrating a different group of residents and business owners. Councilmember Strauss sent a statement to KOMO News that reads, in part, "When people are moved around the neighborhood without addressing their housing needs, their behaviors remain the same, just in a new place. The outcome … is what I worried might happen." Woodward, as of October 2022, no longer lives on the street.

In April 2022, WHS applied to participate in Seattle mayor Bruce Harrell's One Seattle Day of Service. The mayor's office rejected their application.

References

External links

Homelessness in the United States
Organizations based in Seattle